The New Guinea Islands Region is one of four regions of Papua New Guinea (PNG), comprising the Bismarck Archipelago and north-western Solomon Islands Archipelago, located north-east of New Guinea island (the mainland).

This is the least populous inhabited region of the country with an estimated population of 1,096,000 (15% of PNG) in 2011.

It is distinct through its prehistory and history, as shown by the prevalence of Austronesian languages, and archeological findings of Lapita pottery culture.

Subdivision
The Region is administratively divided into five provinces:

Bougainville (North Solomons)
East New Britain
Manus
New Ireland
West New Britain

See also
 Bougainville Island
 Provinces of Papua New Guinea

References

 
Regions of Papua New Guinea